Norah Richards (29 October 1876 – 3 March 1971) was an Irish-born actress and theatre practitioner, who was later called the Lady Gregory of the Punjab. She devoted 60 years (1911–1971) of her life towards enriching the culture of the area. She came to the Punjab in 1911 and produced the first Punjabi play, Dulhan ("The Bride"), written by her pupil I. C. Nanda in 1914.

In 1970, Punjabi University, Patiala, conferred an honorary DLitt degree on her, for her contribution to Punjabi culture, especially Punjabi drama.

Early life and education
Norah Mary Hutman was born in Ireland. She received her formal education in institutions in around the world, mainly Belgium, Oxford University and Sydney.

Career
At a young age she took to the stage and became a successful actress.

She married Philip Ernest Richards, an English teacher and a Unitarian Christian. She came to India in 1908 as her husband accepted a job to teach English literature at Dyal Singh College in Lahore. (Sardar Dyal Singh Majithia, founder of the college, was an ardent follower of Brahmo Samaj, which had a synergic relationship with the Unitarian Christian movement.)

Norah Richards got involved in cultural activities in the college and her enthusiasm helped stimulate much serious theatrical activity. Lahore was the home of Punjabi culture in those days. She brought many Punjabi themes under her English pen and directed a few plays. More importantly, she encouraged students to write their own one act plays and perform them. She had an interest in theosophy and was actively involved in the theosophical movement and home-rule agitation by Dr Annie Besant.

On her husband's death in 1920, Norah returned to England. She came back to India in 1924. Events worked out well for her to settle in the beautiful Kangra Valley, and she made her home in Andretta, Himachal Pradesh. In those days of British Raj, many Britons had acquired lands in the hill states of British India. One such settler who left for England gave away his property to Norah, which came to be known as the Woodlands Estate.

Living amidst villagers, she chose the same lifestyle and made a mud house with a thatched roof for herself. She named it Chameli Niwas. Her  of estate covered by tall trees and wild flowers professed her love for nature. Norah opened a school of drama from which have emerged many famous names of Punjabi drama like Ishwar Chand Nanda, Dr. Harcharan Singh, Balwant Gargi and Gurcharan Singh.

Every year, in the month of March, Norah organised a week-long festival in which students and villagers enacted her plays in an open-air theatre constructed on her estate. Among the guests, Prithvi Raj Kapoor and Balraj Sahni were the most regular. Amongst her other friends who later settled near Woodland Estate were Prof Jai Dayal, painter Sobha Singh and Farida Bedi. Norah's plays were on social reform, displaying wide sympathy with the people's ways and traditions. She wrote scripts while many people came and helped with the production. She wrote newspaper articles and painted watercolours. Andretta thus became the hub of cultural and theatrical activities for a whole generation of artists. One among them was young Bhabesh Chandra Sanyal, who had already won recognition as a sculptor and painter and later on became the doyen of Indian art. He discusses Norah Richards at some length in his autobiography.

"Usually, she would greet me with a khurpa in her hand in home-spun khadi kurta and churidar, her white curls covered with a veil on top of which she donned a straw hat. This was the pattern of her work-a-day dress, grey, or ochre brown in colour. A cotton string around her waist carried a whistle and a suspended pouch carried her spectacles, bunches of keys, pen and pencil and a writing pad and a watch. She would dig the soil of her vegetable garden, tend and water the plants herself.
"I used to feel amused at her idea of discipline and the method of its application to her servants. The work-time was divided between hukka-break, tea-break, rest-break and meals break. With the aid of an alarm clock in her pouch, she would blow her whistle and command: “Hukka pio, hukka pio", and then whistle again at the determined interval for their coming back to work. At the end of the day all her servants would retire to their homes leaving her completely alone to pursue her literary work, letter writing and reading. The little kerosene lamp would burn till after midnight and the tick-tack of her typewriter would begin before dawn." Sanyal continues, “‘Mem’ she was at the core of her heart and remained critical of the villagers fouling the fields and not following her example of digging pits for leafclosets and do her own scavenging and sanitation work. "Sooner than immediate" was the mould of her temperament and she could not tolerate untidiness.

Norah's contribution to Punjabi drama was duly recognised by Punjabi University, Patiala which awarded her an honorary doctorate. The museum of the university houses some of her rare belongings. During the later years of her life, Richards was deeply worried about the future of Woodlands and her large collection of literature and manuscripts. "She toyed with the idea of making a will. Confused in her mind, she made and unmade several."

Though sceptic about governmental control and administration, she offered the estate to the government of Himachal Pradesh, but received no response. Eventually, she left most of her estate and valuable collections to the care of Punjabi University, Patiala.

In the waning days of her life, she was dependent on her attendants for a meagre meal and glass of water. She was placed to rest on 3 March 1971. Her gravestone in Woodlands Retreat has these last words inscribed: “Rest Weary Heart – Thy work is Done."

References

Sources
 Excerpts from B. C. Sanyal's, The Vertical Woman, National Gallery of Modern Art, New Delhi, 1998 and other internet sources. (Compiled by Vipan Kumar courtesy: My Himachal.)

External links

 andrettapottery.com
 Andretta-A sanctuary of potters The Hindu

Indian drama teachers
Indian women dramatists and playwrights
Women writers from Himachal Pradesh
1876 births
1971 deaths
Alumni of the University of Oxford
Irish emigrants to India
Indian people of Irish descent
20th-century Indian women writers
20th-century Indian writers
20th-century Irish women writers
19th-century Indian dramatists and playwrights
19th-century Irish dramatists and playwrights
20th-century Irish dramatists and playwrights
19th-century Indian women writers
19th-century Irish women writers
Irish women dramatists and playwrights
Irish people in colonial India